Chuck Loewen (born January 23, 1957) is an American former professional football player who was a tackle and guard for the San Diego Chargers in the National Football League (NFL). He played for the Chargers from 1980 to 1982 and in 1984.

References

1957 births
Living people
American football offensive tackles
American football offensive guards
South Dakota State Jackrabbits football players
San Diego Chargers players